In enzymology, a 3-keto-steroid reductase is an enzyme that catalyzes the chemical reaction

4alpha-methyl-5alpha-cholest-7-en-3beta-ol + NADP+  4alpha-methyl-5alpha-cholest-7-en-3-one + NADPH + H+

Thus, the two substrates of this enzyme are 4alpha-methyl-5alpha-cholest-7-en-3beta-ol and NADP+, whereas its 3 products are 4alpha-methyl-5alpha-cholest-7-en-3-one, NADPH, and H+.

This enzyme belongs to the family of oxidoreductases, specifically those acting on the CH-OH group of donor with NAD+ or NADP+ as acceptor. The systematic name of this enzyme class is 3beta-hydroxy-steroid:NADP+ 3-oxidoreductase. This enzyme is also called 3-KSR. This enzyme participates in biosynthesis of steroids.

References

 
 

EC 1.1.1
NADPH-dependent enzymes
Enzymes of unknown structure